Neuroctenus elongatus is a species of flat bug in the family Aradidae. It is found in North America.

References

Further reading

 
 
 
 
 

Articles created by Qbugbot
Aradidae
Insects described in 1903